Sageretia henryi is a woody shrub reaching a height of , sometimes although growing to the size of a small tree.  It has green, ovate leaves and yellow or white flowers.  The shrub is found in mountain thickets and dense forests of China in the Gansu, Guangxi, Guizhou, Hubei, Hunan, Shaanxi, Sichuan, Yunnan S Zhejiang.

References
RHAMNACEAE -- 18 Sageretia henryi

henryi
Flora of China